Jonathan McKennedy (born April 5, 1987) is an American race car driver from Chelmsford,  MA. He has won 8 championships in Tour-Type Modifieds and Supermodifieds.

McKennedy is scheduled to drive for Tim and Sheryl Lepine on the NASCAR Whelen Modified Tour in 2022.

Career

McKennedy began racing at age 9. Since starting his career, he has won multiple Karting championships. McKennedy has won 83 races at 25 tracks from Canada to Florida.

Former NASCAR team owner Tommy Baldwin Jr. won his first NASCAR Whelen Modified Tour race with McKennedy, at Myrtle Beach Speedway in 2018. At the time, Baldwin called him "an awesome talent.”

In 2009, McKennedy was ranked third by Vermont Motorsports Magazine.

Championships
2003 350 Supermodified champion at Star Speedway
4x Modified Racing Series champion (2009, 2010, 2012, and 2016). 24 wins, 2nd all-time wins.
4x ISMA Ollie Silva Memorial winner (2012, 2014, 2019, and 2020) at Lee USA Speedway.
4x ISMA Star Classic winner (2013, 2018, 2020, and 2021) at Star Speedway.
2014 Tri-Track Open Modified Series champion 
2015 ISMA Hy-Miler Classic winner at Sandusky Speedway
2016 Northeast Premier Touring Series Driver of the Year
2017 ISMA champion
2018 First NASCAR Whelen Modified Tour win at Myrtle Beach Speedway and North/South Shootout Winner at Concord Motorsports Park
2020 Finished 2nd in NASCAR Whelen Modified Tour championship standings
2022 NASCAR Whelen Modified Tour Champion

Motorsports career results

NASCAR
(key) (Bold – Pole position awarded by qualifying time. Italics – Pole position earned by points standings or practice time. * – Most laps led.)

Whelen Modified Tour

References 

Living people
American racing drivers
1987 births
People from Massachusetts
Racing drivers from Massachusetts
NASCAR drivers
International Supermodified Association